Jimenez Lai  was a faculty member of UCLA. He is also the founder and leader of Bureau Spectacular, a design studio founded in 2008 and led by Jimenez Lai.

Academic career
Jimenez Lai was a faculty member at UCLA.
Lai previously held the LeFevre Fellowship at the Knowlton School of Architecture at the Ohio State University in 2007 and the Howarth-Wright Fellowship at Taliesin (studio)/Taliesin West. He was an assistant professor at University of Illinois at Chicago.

Published works
"Primitives".  Log/Issue 22.
"On Types of Seductive Robustness".  Candide / Issue 3.
"Obstruction: A New Healthy Body".  Pidgin / Issue 9.
"The Future Archaeologist".  PLOT / Issue 1
"Plan v Section".  Conditions / Issue 5+6
"The Future Archaeologist".  Beyond Magazine / Issue 3
"Big Box Robotz".  Journal of American Institute of Architecture Students / Spring 2010
"Laundry Man".  Conditions / Issue 3
"Point Clouds".  MAS Context / Issue 4
"Vertical Urbanism".  306090 / Issue 12

Jimenez Lai's monograph, Citizens of no place : an architectural graphic novel supported by the Graham Foundation for Advanced Studies in the Fine Arts and Princeton Architectural Press.

Built Work
Tower of Twelve Stories Installation / Coachella Valley Music Festival / Coachella, CA. 2016
White Elephant (Privately Soft) Installation / Land of Tomorrow (LoT) / Louisville, KY. 2011
The Briefcase House Super Furniture / Chicago, IL. 2010.
Point Clouds Installation / Extension Gallery / Chicago, IL. 2009.
Phalanstery Module  Installation / Materials & Applications / Los Angeles, CA. 2008

Videos
Point Clouds Installation in Extension Gallery, 2009. Supported by the Graham Foundation for Advanced Studies in the Fine Arts.
Phalanstery Module for Materials & Applications 2008.
Jimenez Lai at Pecha Kucha 2010.

References

External links
BUREAU SPECTACULAR Official website
BUREAU SPECTACULAR/Jimenez Lai Architizer Page
Citizens of No Place

1979 births
Living people
University of Illinois Chicago faculty
Architectural theoreticians
University of Toronto alumni
Alternative cartoonists
Canadian comics artists
Canadian cartoonists
Taiwanese comics artists